The Fourqurean House, once part of the Little Plantation, is a historic house on Bold Spring Road, southwest of South Boston, Virginia.  It is a modest -story wood-frame structure, with a clapboarded exterior, end chimneys, and gabled roof.  It has a three-bay front facade, with an off-center doorway between more evenly spaced sash windows.  The house was built in 1830, and is a rare surviving example of a modest early plantation house in rural Virginia.

The property was listed on the National Register of Historic Places in 1980.

See also
National Register of Historic Places listings in Halifax County, Virginia

References

Houses on the National Register of Historic Places in Virginia
Houses completed in 1830
Houses in Halifax County, Virginia
National Register of Historic Places in Halifax County, Virginia